Very Cool is an album by American jazz saxophonist Lee Konitz which was his first released on the Verve label in 1957.

Track listing 
 "Sunflower" (Don Ferrara) - 8:06
 "Stairway to the Stars" (Matty Malneck, Frank Signorelli, Mitchell Parish) - 5:24   
 "Movin' Around" (Ferrara) - 7:49
 "Kary's Trance" (Lee Konitz) - 7:13
 "Crazy She Calls Me" (Carl Sigman Bob Russell) – 7:26   
 "Billie's Bounce" (Charlie Parker) - 6:13

Personnel 
Lee Konitz - alto saxophone
Don Ferrara - trumpet 
Sal Mosca - piano
Peter Ind - bass
Shadow Wilson - drums

References 

Lee Konitz albums
1957 albums
Albums produced by Norman Granz
Verve Records albums